Tadeusz Aziewicz (born 31 October 1960 in Sopot) is a Polish politician. He was elected to the Sejm on 25 September 2005, getting 9093 votes in 26 Gdynia district as a candidate from the Civic Platform list.

See also
Members of Polish Sejm 2005-2007

External links
Tadeusz Aziewicz - parliamentary page - includes declarations of interest, voting record, and transcripts of speeches.

Civic Platform politicians
1960 births
Living people
People from Sopot
Members of the Polish Sejm 2005–2007
Members of the Polish Sejm 2007–2011
Members of the Polish Sejm 2011–2015
Members of the Polish Sejm 2015–2019
Members of the Polish Sejm 2019–2023
University of Gdańsk alumni
Recipient of the Meritorious Activist of Culture badge